Peter A. Locke is an American film producer, and co-founder of The Kushner-Locke Company along with his partner, Donald Kushner.

Locke's television credits include the series The Stockard Channing Show, Automan, six seasons of 1st & Ten, 860 episodes of Divorce Court, 66 episodes of Sweating Bullets, Contraption, Gun, Cracker, and Harts of the West. Additionally he has produced 38 Movies of the Week, six mini-series, game shows, animated syndicated shows and over 50 direct-to-video/DVD titles.

Locke is an agent for Castel Film Studios in Bucharest, Romania, one of the largest studio facilities in Europe.

Peter Locke is the father of musician Taylor Locke, co-founder and lead guitarist of the bands Rooney and Taylor Locke and the Roughs.

Locke is married to Liz Torres since 1974.

References

External links

Interview with Locke at kamera.co.uk's Film Salon
Filmbug page

American film producers
Living people
Year of birth missing (living people)
The Kushner-Locke Company
American independent film production company founders